Zollikofen railway station is a railway station in the municipality of Münchenbuchsee, in the Swiss canton of Bern. It is an intermediate stop on the standard gauge Biel/Bienne–Bern and Olten–Bern lines of Swiss Federal Railways and the  gauge Solothurn–Worblaufen line of Regionalverkehr Bern-Solothurn.

Services 
The following services stop at Zollikofen:

 Bern S-Bahn:
 : rush-hour service between Biel/Bienne and Belp.

References

External links 
 
 

Railway stations in the canton of Bern
Swiss Federal Railways stations